On the Reeperbahn at Half Past Midnight is a 1954 West German comedy drama film directed by Wolfgang Liebeneiner and starring Hans Albers, Heinz Rühmann and Fita Benkhoff. The film is set in Hamburg and was one of two 1950s films starring Albers attempting to emulate the success of his 1944 hit Große Freiheit Nr. 7. The film takes its name from the 1912 song of the same name and is not a remake of the 1929 silent film of the same title. A further version was made in 1969 with Curd Jürgens.

It was shot at the Tempelhof Studios in West Berlin and on location around Hamburg, including St. Pauli and Cuxhaven as well as on Heligoland. The film's sets were designed by the art directors Willi Herrmann and Heinrich Weidemann.

Synopsis
After many years away sailor Hannes Wedderkamp returns to his home city of Hamburg and meets up with his old friend Pittes Breuer who owns a venue on the Reeperbahn. Currently struggling, Hannes helps him turn it around by introducing a new revue. He also takes a kindly interest in his friend's grown-up daughter, only to discover that she is in fact really his own child who has been brought up by Pittes. When the two men fall out shortly afterwards, Pittes falls in with an unscrupulous con man and it falls to Hannes to save him.

Cast
Hans Albers as Hannes Wedderkamp
Heinz Rühmann as Pittes Breuer
Fita Benkhoff as Luise
Erwin Strahl as Bilek
Sybil Werden as Marion
Gustav Knuth as Brandstetter snr.
Fritz Wagner as Kattmann
Helga Franck as Anni
Jürgen Graf as Jürgen Brandstetter
Wolfgang Neuss as Nigrantz
Else Reval as Die stramme Emma
Liselotte Malkowsky as Singer
Carl Hinrichs as Bootsmann Jan
Wulf Rittscher as Herr Ettmann
Wolfgang Müller as Matrose
Al Hoosmann as Ein Gast
George André Martin as Hausknecht Smittie
Michael Piel as Tänzer
Marion Soremba as Singer

References

External links

1954 films
1950s musical comedy-drama films
German musical comedy-drama films
West German films
Films directed by Wolfgang Liebeneiner
Films set in Hamburg
Films shot in Hamburg
Films featuring underwater diving
Treasure hunt films
1950s buddy films
Films shot at Tempelhof Studios
1950s German films
1950s German-language films